Henri Marchand may refer to:

 Henri Marchand (sculptor) (1887–1960), French-American sculptor
 Henri Marchand (actor) (1898–1959), French actor